Armagh was a county constituency of the Parliament of Northern Ireland from 1921 to 1929. It returned four MPs, using proportional representation by means of the single transferable vote.

Boundaries
Armagh was created by the Government of Ireland Act 1920 and consisted of the entirety of County Armagh. The House of Commons (Method of Voting and Redistribution of Seats) Act (Northern Ireland) 1929 divided the constituency into four constituencies elected under first past the post: Central, Mid, North and South Armagh constituencies.

Second Dáil
In May 1921, Dáil Éireann, the parliament of the self-declared Irish Republic run by Sinn Féin, passed a resolution declaring that elections to the House of Commons of Northern Ireland and the House of Commons of Southern Ireland would be used as the election for the Second Dáil. All those elected were on the roll of the Second Dáil, but Michael Collins, who was also elected for Cork Mid, North, South, South East and West, was the only MP elected for Armagh to sit as a TD in Dáil Éireann.

Politics
Armagh had a slight Unionist majority, but this was fairly evenly balanced with a Nationalist minority. In both general elections, two Unionists were elected, alongside one Nationalist and one Republican.

Members of Parliament

MPs' lifespans

Elections

 Collins died on 22 August 1922; his seat remained vacant at dissolution.

 Appointment of Best as Lord Justice of Appeal

References

See also
 Northern Ireland Parliamentary Election Results 1921-1972, compiled and edited by Sydney Elliott (Political Reference Publications 1973)

Northern Ireland Parliament constituencies established in 1921
Northern Ireland Parliament constituencies disestablished in 1929
Constituencies of the Northern Ireland Parliament
Dáil constituencies in Northern Ireland (historic)
Historic constituencies in County Armagh